{{Speciesbox
| name = Comb-finned squid
| status = DD
| status_system = IUCN3.1
| status_ref = 
| image = Chtenopteryx sicula.jpg
| image_caption = Chtenopteryx sicula caught off Naples.
| taxon = Chtenopteryx sicula
| authority = (Vérany, 1851)<ref name = WoRMS>{{cite web | url = http://www.marinespecies.org/aphia.php?p=taxdetails&id=181377 | title = 'Chtenopteryx sicula (Vérany, 1851) | accessdate = 25 February 2018 | publisher = Flanders Marine Institute | author = Julian Finn | year = 2016 | work = World Register of Marine Species}}</ref>
| synonyms = *Calliteuthis nevroptera Jatta, 1896Chtenopteryx fimbriatus Appellöf, 1890Chtenopteryx siculus (Vérany, 1851)Ctenopteryx cyprinoides Joubin, 1894Ctenopteryx sicula (Vérany, 1851)Sepioteuthis sicula Vérany, 1851
| synonyms_ref = 
}}Chtenopteryx sicula, also known as the comb-finned squid or toothed-fin squid, is a species of squid native to at least the Mediterranean Sea. It is characterised by several distinct morphological features: ocular photophores are present but visceral photophores are absent, arm suckers are arranged in at least 4 series distally, and club suckers are borne in more than 8 series.

The type specimen was collected off Messina, Italy; the specific name sicula means "of Sicily". It is deposited at the Muséum d'Histoire Naturelle (Musée Barla) in Nice.

References

Further reading
Naef, A. 1921–23. Cephalopoda. Fauna e Flora de Golfo di Napoli''. Monograph, no. 35.

External links

 Tree of Life web project: Chtenopteryx sicula

Squid
Cephalopods described in 1851
Marine molluscs of Europe
Cephalopods of Europe